The Office of the Inspector General of Colombia is a Colombian independent public institution overseeing the public conduct of those in authority or in charge of exercising a public office, and of overseeing the correct functioning of other government institutions and agencies. The Office of the Inspector General of Colombia is not a judicial institution; it is one of the Colombian Control Institutions, alongside the Office of the Controller General. The Inspector General is also charged with safeguarding the rights of the people, guaranteeing Human rights protection and intervening in the name of the people in the defence of the public's interest.

Functions
According to the Colombian Constitution of 1991, one of the main purposes of the Inspector General is to prevent, intervene and start disciplinary actions. It prevents before having to take action; it is charged with overseeing public officials' performance and warns of any violation to the current norms. It intervenes in the different jurisdictions in defence of the legal order, public funds and fundamental rights and freedoms. The Inspector General is in charge of initiating, developing and ruling investigations against public officials in accordance with the Unique Disciplinary Code.

Criticism 
In July 2022, then president-elect Gustavo Petro claimed that he would promote the removal of the Office of the Inspector General, with the purpose of "listening to the judgment of the Inter-American Court of Human Rights and in the process respecting the American Convention." He added that the apparatus's funding would be spent in "strengthening" judiciary power, and establishing "the great Anti-Corruption Prosecutor's Office."

Colombian politicians like Juan Manuel Galán Pachón and Piedad Córdoba have supported this change, calling the institution a "monarchical, old, expensive institution" and a "tool of persecution of the extreme right —a biased body that protects political clans," respectively.

In an interview with El Tiempo, lawyers Juan Carlos Ospina and Silvia Serrano stated that "the proposal for the elimination or complete transformation of the Attorney General's Office goes beyond what was ordered by the Inter-American Court" and that "the ruling of the Inter-American Court of Human Rights did not order the elimination of the control body or the transferring of its functions to the judiciary but to adapt the domestic system so that the Attorney General's Office does not have the power to dismiss or disqualify popularly elected officials."

References

Government agencies established in 1830
Colombian Control Institutions
Prosecution
1830 establishments in Gran Colombia